Tetraodontidae is a  family of primarily marine and estuarine fish of the order Tetraodontiformes. The family includes many familiar species variously called pufferfish, puffers, balloonfish, blowfish, blowers, blowies, bubblefish, globefish, swellfish, toadfish, toadies, toadle, honey toads, sugar toads, and sea squab. They are morphologically similar to the closely related porcupinefish, which have large external spines (unlike the thinner, hidden spines of the Tetraodontidae, which are only visible when the fish have puffed up). The scientific name refers to the four large teeth, fused into an upper and lower plate, which are used for crushing the hard shells of crustaceans and mollusks, their natural prey.

The majority of pufferfish species are toxic and some are among the most poisonous vertebrates in the world. In certain species, the internal organs, such as the liver, and sometimes the skin, contain tetrodotoxin, and are highly toxic to most animals when eaten; nevertheless, the meat of some species is considered a delicacy in Japan (as 河豚, pronounced fugu), Korea (as 복, bok, or 복어, bogeo), and China (as 河豚, hétún) when prepared by specially trained chefs who know which part is safe to eat and in what quantity. Other pufferfish species with nontoxic flesh, such as the northern puffer, Sphoeroides maculatus, of Chesapeake Bay, are considered a delicacy elsewhere.

The species Torquigener albomaculosus was described by David Attenborough as "the greatest artist of the animal kingdom" due to the males' unique habit of wooing females by creating nests in sand composed of complex geometric designs.

Genera 
The Tetraodontidae contain 193 species of puffers in 28 genera:

 Amblyrhynchotes Troschel, 1856
 Arothron Müller, 1841
 Auriglobus Kottelat, 1999
 Canthigaster Swainson, 1839
 Carinotetraodon Benl, 1957
 Chelonodon Müller, 1841
 Chonerhinos Bleeker, 1854
 Colomesus Gill, 1884
 Contusus Whitley, 1947

 Dichotomyctere Duméril, 1855

 Ephippion Bibron, 1855
 Feroxodon Su, Hardy et Tyler, 1986
 Guentheridia Gilbert et Starks, 1904
 Javichthys Hardy, 1985
 Leiodon Swainson, 1839
 Lagocephalus Swainson, 1839
 Marilyna Hardy, 1982
 Omegophora Whitley, 1934
 Pelagocephalus Tyler & Paxton, 1979
 Polyspina Hardy, 1983
 Pao Kottelat, 2013
 Reicheltia Hardy, 1982
 Sphoeroides Anonymous, 1798
 Takifugu Abe, 1949
 Tetractenos Hardy, 1983
 Tetraodon Linnaeus, 1758
 Torquigener Whitley, 1930
 Tylerius Hardy, 1984

Morphology 

Tetraodontiformes, or pufferfish, are most significantly characterized by the beak-like four teeth – hence the name combining the Greek terms "tetra" for four and "odous" for tooth. The top and bottom arches are fused together with a visible midsagittal demarcation, which are used to break apart and consume small crustaceans. The lack of ribs, a pelvis, and pectoral fins are also unique to pufferfish. The notably missing bone and fin features are due to the pufferfish' specialized defense mechanism, expanding by sucking in water through an oral cavity.

Pufferfish can also have many varied structures of caltrop-like dermal spines, which account for the replacement of typical fish scales, and can range in coverage extent from the entire body, to leaving the frontal surface empty. Tetraodontidae typically have smaller spines than the sister family Diodontidae, with some spines not being visible until inflation.

Distribution 
They are most diverse in the tropics, relatively uncommon in the temperate zone, and completely absent from cold waters.

Ecology and life history 
Most pufferfish species live in marine or brackish waters, but some can enter fresh water.  About 35 species spend their entire lifecycles in fresh water. These freshwater species are found in disjunct tropical regions of South America (Colomesus asellus and Colomesus tocantinensis), Africa (six Tetraodon species), and Southeast Asia (Auriglobus, Carinotetraodon, Dichotomyctere, Leiodon and Pao).

Natural defenses 
The puffer's unique and distinctive natural defenses help compensate for its slow locomotion. It moves by combining pectoral, dorsal, anal, and caudal fin motions. This makes it highly maneuverable, but very slow, so a comparatively easy predation target.  Its tail fin is mainly used as a rudder, but it can be used for a sudden evasive burst of speed that shows none of the care and precision of its usual movements.  The puffer's excellent eyesight, combined with this speed burst, is the first and most important defense against predators.

The pufferfish's secondary defense mechanism, used if successfully pursued, is to fill its extremely elastic stomach with water (or air when outside the water) until it is much larger and almost spherical in shape.  Even if they are not visible when the puffer is not inflated, all puffers have pointed spines, so a hungry predator may suddenly find itself facing an unpalatable, pointy ball rather than a slow, easy meal.  Predators that do not heed this warning (or are "lucky" enough to catch the puffer suddenly, before or during inflation) may die from choking, and predators that do manage to swallow the puffer may find their stomachs full of tetrodotoxin (TTX), making puffers an unpleasant, possibly lethal, choice of prey. This neurotoxin is found primarily in the ovaries and liver, although smaller amounts exist in the intestines and skin, as well as trace amounts in muscle.  It does not always have a lethal effect on large predators, such as sharks, but it can kill humans.

Larval pufferfish are chemically defended by the presence of TTX on the surface of skin, which causes predators to spit them out.

Not all puffers are necessarily poisonous; the flesh of the northern puffer is not toxic (a level of poison can be found in its viscera) and it is considered a delicacy in North America. Takifugu oblongus, for example, is a fugu puffer that is not poisonous, and toxin level varies widely even in fish that are. A puffer's neurotoxin is not necessarily as toxic to other animals as it is to humans, and puffers are eaten routinely by some species of fish, such as lizardfish and sharks.

Puffers are able to move their eyes independently, and many species can change the color or intensity of their patterns in response to environmental changes. In these respects, they are somewhat similar to the terrestrial chameleon. Although most puffers are drab, many have bright colors and distinctive markings, and make no attempt to hide from predators. This is likely an example of honestly signaled aposematism.

Dolphins have been filmed expertly handling pufferfish amongst themselves in an apparent attempt to get intoxicated or enter a trance-like state.

Reproduction 

Many marine puffers have a pelagic, or open-ocean, life stage. Spawning occurs after males slowly push females to the water surface or join females already present. The eggs are spherical and buoyant. Hatching occurs after roughly four days. The fry are tiny, but under magnification have a shape usually reminiscent of a pufferfish.  They have a functional mouth and eyes, and must eat within a few days.  Brackish-water puffers may breed in bays in a manner similar to marine species, or may breed more similarly to the freshwater species, in cases where they have moved far enough upriver.

Reproduction in freshwater species varies quite a bit. The dwarf puffers court with males following females, possibly displaying the crests and keels unique to this subgroup of species.  After the female accepts his advances, she will lead the male into plants or another form of cover, where she can release eggs for fertilization. The male may help her by rubbing against her side.  This has been observed in captivity, and they are the only commonly captive-spawned puffer species.

Target-group puffers have also been spawned in aquaria, and follow a similar courting behavior, minus the crest/keel display. Eggs are laid, though, on a flat piece of slate or other smooth, hard material, to which they adhere. The male will guard them until they hatch, carefully blowing water over them regularly to keep the eggs healthy. His parenting is finished when the young hatch and the fry are on their own.

In 2012, males of the species Torquigener albomaculosus were documented while carving large and complex geometric, circular structures in the seabed sand in Amami Ōshima, Japan. The structures serve to attract females and to provide a safe place for them to lay their eggs.

Information on breeding of specific species is very limited. T. nigroviridis, the green-spotted puffer, has recently been spawned artificially under captive conditions. It is believed to spawn in bays in a similar manner to saltwater species, as their sperm was found to be motile only at full marine salinities, but wild breeding has never been observed. Xenopterus naritus has been reported to be the first bred artificially in Sarawak, Northwestern Borneo, in June 2016, and the main purpose was for development of aquaculture of the species.

Diet 
Pufferfish diets can vary depending on their environment. Traditionally, their diet consists mostly of algae and small invertebrates. They can survive on a completely vegetarian diet if their environment is lacking resources, but prefer an omnivorous food selection. Larger species of pufferfish are able to use their beak-like front teeth to break open clams, mussels, and other shellfish. Some species of pufferfish have also been known to enact various hunting techniques ranging from ambush to open-water hunting.

Evolution 
The tetraodontids have been estimated to have diverged from diodontids between 89 and 138 million years ago. The four major clades diverged during the Cretaceous between 80 and 101 million years ago.  The oldest known pufferfish genus is Eotetraodon, from the Lutetian epoch of Middle Eocene Europe, with fossils found in Monte Bolca and the Caucasus Mountains.  The Monte Bolca species, E. pygmaeus, coexisted with several other tetraodontiforms, including an extinct species of diodontid, primitive boxfish (Proaracana and Eolactoria), and other, totally extinct forms, such as Zignoichthys and the spinacanthids.  The extinct genus, Archaeotetraodon is known from Miocene-aged fossils from Europe.

Poisoning 
Pufferfish can be lethal if not served properly. Puffer poisoning usually results from consumption of incorrectly prepared puffer soup, fugu chiri, or occasionally from raw puffer meat, sashimi fugu. While chiri is much more likely to cause death, sashimi fugu often causes intoxication, light-headedness, and numbness of the lips. Pufferfish tetrodotoxin deadens the tongue and lips, and induces dizziness and vomiting, followed by numbness and prickling over the body, rapid heart rate, decreased blood pressure, and muscle paralysis. The toxin paralyzes the diaphragm muscle and stops the person who has ingested it from breathing. People who live longer than 24 hours typically survive, although possibly after a coma lasting several days.

The source of tetrodotoxin in puffers has been a matter of debate, but it is increasingly accepted that bacteria in the fish's intestinal tract are the source.

Saxitoxin, the cause of paralytic shellfish poisoning and red tide, can also be found in certain puffers.

Philippines 
In September 2012, the Bureau of Fisheries and Aquatic Resources in the Philippines issued a warning not to eat puffer fish, after local fishermen died upon consuming puffer fish for dinner. The warning indicated that puffer fish toxin is 100 times more potent than cyanide.

Thailand 

Pufferfish, called pakapao in Thailand, are usually consumed by mistake.  They are often cheaper than other fish, and because they contain inconsistent levels of toxins between fish and season, there is little awareness or monitoring of the danger. Consumers are regularly hospitalized and some even die from the poisoning.

United States 

Cases of neurological symptoms, including numbness and tingling of the lips and mouth, have been reported to rise after the consumption of puffers caught in the area of Titusville, Florida, USA. The symptoms generally resolve within hours to days, although one affected individual required intubation for 72 hours.  As a result, Florida banned the harvesting of puffers from certain bodies of water.

Treatment 
Treatment is mainly supportive and consists of intestinal decontamination with gastric lavage and activated charcoal, and life-support until the toxin is metabolized. Case reports suggest anticholinesterases such as edrophonium may be effective.

See also 
 Shimonoseki – Japanese city known for its locally caught pufferfish
 Toado – common Australian name for local varieties of pufferfish

References

Further reading 
 
 Ebert, Klaus (2001): The Puffers of Fresh and Brackish Water, Aqualog, .
 
 

 
Commercial fish
Aposematic animals
Ray-finned fish families
Taxa named by Charles Lucien Bonaparte
Extant Lutetian first appearances